Tân Phú may refer to several places in Vietnam, including:

 Tân Phú District, Ho Chi Minh City, an urban district of Ho Chi Minh City
 Tân Phú District, Đồng Nai, a rural district of Đồng Nai Province
 Tân Phú, District 7, a ward of District 7, Ho Chi Minh City
 Tân Phú, District 9, a ward of District 9, Ho Chi Minh City
 Tân Phú, Cần Thơ, a ward of Cái Răng District
 Tân Phú, Đồng Xoài, a ward of Đồng Xoài, Bình Phước Province
 Tân Phú, Đồng Phú, a township and capital of Đồng Phú District in Bình Phước Province
 Tân Phú, Đồng Nai, a township and capital of Tân Phú District in Đồng Nai Province
 Tân Phú, Hanoi, a commune of Quốc Oai District
 Tân Phú, Thái Nguyên, a commune of Phổ Yên
 Tân Phú, Cai Lậy, a commune of Cai Lậy, Tiền Giang Province
 Tân Phú, Hậu Giang, a commune of Long Mỹ
 Tân Phú, An Giang, a commune of Châu Thành District, An Giang Province
 Tân Phú, Bến Tre, a commune of Châu Thành District, Bến Tre Province
 Tân Phú, Cà Mau, a commune of Thới Bình District
 Tân Phú, a commune of Châu Thành District, Đồng Tháp Province
 Tân Phú, Thanh Bình, a commune of Thanh Bình District, Đồng Tháp Province
 Tân Phú, Long An, a commune of Đức Hòa District
 Tân Phú, Nghệ An, a commune of Tân Kỳ District
 Tân Phú, Phú Thọ, a commune of Tân Sơn District
 Tân Phú, Tây Ninh, a commune of Tân Châu District, Tây Ninh
 Tân Phú, Tân Phú Đông, a commune of Tân Phú Đông District, Tiền Giang Province
 Tân Phú, Vĩnh Long, a commune of Tam Bình District

See also
 Phú Tân (disambiguation)
 Tân Phú Đông District, Tiền Giang Province
 Tân Phú Đông, Đồng Tháp, a commune of Sa Đéc
 Tân Phú Tây, a commune of Mỏ Cày Bắc District, Bến Tre Province
 Tân Phú Thạnh, a commune of Châu Thành A District, Hậu Giang Province
 Tân Phú Trung, Ho Chi Minh City, a commune of Củ Chi District
 Tân Phú Trung, Đồng Tháp, a commune of Châu Thành District, Đồng Tháp Province